Thaddeus Edward Carhart (born February 16, 1950) is an American writer. He is the author of bestseller The Piano Shop on the Left Bank, a memoir of his experiences with pianos and his time spent in a Parisian piano atelier. His book Across the Endless River is a historical novel about Jean-Baptiste Charbonneau, the son of Sacagawea, and his intriguing sojourn as a young man in 1820s Europe.

Early life and education
Thaddeus Edward Carhart was born in 1950 at Tuscaloosa, Alabama to Air Force Major Thomas M. Carhart and May [Welch] Carhart, and lived in numerous locations while growing up.  He graduated with a degree in Anthropology from Yale University and also worked as an interpreter for the State Department.  He pursued graduate studies at Stanford University.

Personal life
At the time of this writing, Thad Carhart resides in Paris with his wife and two children.

Writing inspiration
Thad Carhart describes his writing interest as being in the mid-1820s Europe.

Bibliography

References

External links

1950 births
Living people
Stanford University alumni
Yale University alumni
21st-century American writers
American male writers
Writers from Paris